The Instituto de Astrofísica de Canarias (IAC) is an astrophysical research institute located in the Canary Islands, Spain. It was founded in 1975 at the University of La Laguna. It operates two astronomical observatories in the Canary Islands: Roque de los Muchachos Observatory on La Palma, and Teide Observatory on Tenerife.

The current director of the IAC is Rafael Rebolo López. In 2016, English scientist Stephen Hawking was appointed Honorary Professor of the IAC, the first such appointment made by the institute.

See also 
 Instituto de Astrofísica de Andalucía

References

External links 
 IAC Homepage
 European Northern Observatory

Tenerife
Research institutes in Spain
Astronomy institutes and departments
Astrophysics institutes
Organisations based in the Canary Islands
San Cristóbal de La Laguna